is a Japanese animation studio based in Naka-ku, Yokohama.

Works

Television series

ONAs

Net Anime

Net films

OVAs

References

External links

  
 

 
Japanese animation studios
Japanese companies established in 2015
Mass media companies established in 2015
Companies based in Yokohama